Michał Roch Szczerba (1977–present) is a Polish politician, member of Polish parliament since 2007 (reelected in 2011 and 2015) from the Platforma Obywatelska party.

In 2016 his actions were one of the triggers of the December 2016 Polish protests.

References

External links
Page on Polish Sejm official page
Career history

1977 births
Civic Platform politicians
Members of the Polish Sejm 2007–2011
Members of the Polish Sejm 2011–2015
Members of the Polish Sejm 2015–2019
Members of the Polish Sejm 2019–2023
University of Warsaw alumni
Living people